Yefremovsky District is an administrative district (raion), one of the twenty-three in Tula Oblast, Russia. As a municipal division, it is incorporated as Yefremov Urban Okrug. It is located in the southeast of the oblast. Its administrative center is the town of Yefremov. Population: 64,227 (2010 Census);  The population of Yefremov accounts for 65.9% of the district's total population.

References

Notes

Sources

Districts of Tula Oblast